Edward O'Donnell may refer to:

Eddie O'Donnell (1887–1920), American race car driver
Edward O'Donnell (bootlegger) or Spike O'Donnell (1890–1962), American mobster of Irish descent
Edward J. O'Donnell (military) (1907–1991), U.S. Navy rear admiral and commander of Guantanamo Bay Naval Base
Edward J. O'Donnell (academic administrator) (1909–1986), President of Marquette University (1948–1962)
Edward Joseph O'Donnell (1931–2009), Roman Catholic Bishop of the Diocese of Lafayette, Louisiana